Hawkesbury City, is a semi-professional soccer club, based and located in the Hawkesbury area of New South Wales. In season 2023, they are set to compete in the NSW League Two (formerly NSW NPL 3) competition.

Senior Team History 
In 2018 the club finished 2nd on the table with 54 points, behind premiers St George City on 59 points. The side lost 2–1 to SD Raiders in the semi final.

Honours
NPL NSW 3 Runners-up 2018

References

External links 
Hawkesbury City Website
State League Competition Website

Soccer clubs in New South Wales